Romildo Del Piage de Souza (born 12 April 2000), known as Del Piage or just Romildo, is a Brazilian footballer who plays as a midfielder for RWD Molenbeek.

Club career
Del Piage was born in São José dos Campos, São Paulo, and began his career with hometown side São José dos Campos FC. He moved to Palmeiras in 2017, He returned from loan in July 2019, with the club now called Joseense, and played in four first team matches in the Campeonato Paulista Segunda Divisão before joining Botafogo on 13 September.

Del Piage made his first team – and Série A – debut for Bota on 10 January 2021, starting in a 0–3 away loss against Vasco da Gama. In March, he signed a permanent deal with the club, until the end of 2023.

Del Piage scored his first professional goal on 24 July 2021, netting the winner in a 1–0 Série B away success over Confiança.

Career statistics

Honours
Botafogo
 Campeonato Brasileiro Série B: 2021

References

External links
Botafogo profile 

2000 births
Living people
People from São José dos Campos
Brazilian footballers
Association football midfielders
Campeonato Brasileiro Série A players
Campeonato Brasileiro Série B players
Clube Atlético Joseense players
Botafogo de Futebol e Regatas players
Footballers from São Paulo (state)